William Shaw (5 August 1827 – 13 February 1890) was an English first-class cricketer active 1866 who played for Nottinghamshire. He was born and died in Burton Joyce.

References

1827 births
1890 deaths
English cricketers
Nottinghamshire cricketers